Telstar 14R, also known as Estrela do Sul 2 (Southern Star 2) is a commercial communications satellite in the Telstar series built by Space Systems/Loral for Telesat to provide Ku-band communications to South America and the Southern United States. It is a replacement for Telstar 14, whose north solar array failed to open after launch, limiting its mission effectiveness. Telstar 14R experienced the same problem, with its north solar array failing to open too, but is now in service despite that failure.

Launch
It was launched 20 May 2011 from the Baikonur Cosmodrome in Kazakhstan aboard an International Launch Services Proton-M rocket. Telstar 14R is built around the Loral 1300 satellite bus, and has a launch mass of around 5000 kg. It is positioned in geosynchronous orbit at 63 degrees west.

See also

 2011 in spaceflight

References

External links
 http://www.telesat.com/satellite-fleet/telstar/telstar-14r 
 http://space.skyrocket.de/doc_sdat/telstar-14r.htm
 http://spaceflightnow.com/news/n1105/25telstar14r/index.html
 http://www.nasaspaceflight.com/2011/05/live-ils-proton-m-launch-with-telstar-14r/

Telstar satellites
Spacecraft launched in 2011
Satellites using the SSL 1300 bus